The Palm Beach Daily News is a newspaper serving the town of Palm Beach in Palm Beach County in South Florida. It is also known as "The Shiny Sheet" because of its heavy, slick newsprint stock. It was founded in 1897 as the Lake Worth Daily News, and it covers the news and social affairs of the residents on the island of Palm Beach itself. Previously owned by Cox Enterprises, it has been a sister publication of The Palm Beach Post since 1948, when Florida newspaper owner John Perry, owner of The Post, bought the Daily News as well. Cox acquired all of Perry's properties in the Palm Beaches in 1969. Virginia-based Gannett currently owns the newspaper.

On October 31, 2017, Cox Media Group announced its plans to sell the Palm Beach Daily News and Palm Beach Post. In 2018, it was announced that GateHouse Media would buy the newspapers for $49.25 million, with the deal closed in May.

See also

 List of newspapers in Florida

References

External links
 Official website

Newspapers published in Florida
Palm Beach, Florida
Publications established in 1897
1897 establishments in Florida
Gannett publications